The Fil Bridge, also known as Silahtarağa Bridge is a  long, concrete bowstring bridge that crosses the Alibeyköy Creek in Istanbul, Turkey. The bridge was completed in 1932 by the Istanbul Metropolitan Municipality.

The bridge is closed to automobile traffic, with the exception of motorcycles, and is a pedestrian bridge.

References

Bridges in Istanbul
Bridges completed in 1932
Golden Horn
Eyüp
Road bridges in Turkey
Pedestrian bridges in Turkey
Tied arch bridges